The 1944 Brooklyn Dodgers saw a constant roster turnover as players left for service in World War II. The team finished the season in seventh place in the National League.

Regular season

Season standings

Record vs. opponents

Notable transactions 
 June 6, 1944: Bob Chipman was traded by the Dodgers to the Chicago Cubs for Eddie Stanky.
 August 12, 1944: Frank Drews was traded by the Dodgers to the Boston Braves for Mike Sandlock and cash.

Roster

Player stats

Batting

Starters by position 
Note: Pos = Position; G = Games played; AB = At bats; H = Hits; Avg. = Batting average; HR = Home runs; RBI = Runs batted in

Other batters 
Note: G = Games played; AB = At bats; H = Hits; Avg. = Batting average; HR = Home runs; RBI = Runs batted in

Pitching

Starting pitchers 
Note: G = Games pitched; IP = Innings pitched; W = Wins; L = Losses; ERA = Earned run average; SO = Strikeouts

Other pitchers 
Note: G = Games pitched; IP = Innings pitched; W = Wins; L = Losses; ERA = Earned run average; SO = Strikeouts

Relief pitchers 
Note: G = Games pitched; W = Wins; L = Losses; SV = Saves; ERA = Earned run average; SO = Strikeouts

Awards and honors 
1944 Major League Baseball All-Star Game
Augie Galan starter
Dixie Walker starter
Mickey Owen reserve
TSN Major League All-Star Team
Dixie Walker

Farm system

Notes

References
Baseball-Reference season page
Baseball Almanac season page

External links
1944 Brooklyn Dodgers uniform
Brooklyn Dodgers reference site
Acme Dodgers page 
Retrosheet

Los Angeles Dodgers seasons
Brooklyn Dodgers season
Brooklyn
1940s in Brooklyn
Flatbush, Brooklyn